Riaan Viljoen (born 1 April 1983) is a professional South African rugby union rugby player, currently playing with Japanese Super Rugby side the  and Top League West side NTT DoCoMo Red Hurricanes. He was born in Carletonville, South Africa and his first tour with the Springboks was to France, Italy, Ireland and England in late 2009 where he played in two touring matches. He signed with the Sharks for the 2012 and the 2013 Super Rugby tournaments.

In 2013, he signed a deal to play in the Top League in Japan for NTT DoCoMo Red Hurricanes. For 2016 he joined the new Japanese Super Rugby team Sunwolves.

Honours
 Tour matches: 2
 Total Springbok matches: 2
 Win ratio:
 Tours:
 France, Italy, Ireland & England, 2009.
 North West Craven Week 2001.
 Griquas Currie Cup 2008.

References

External links

Cheetahs Profile
Scrum.com Profile
itsrugby.co.uk Profile

1983 births
Living people
Afrikaner people
Cheetahs (rugby union) players
Expatriate rugby union players in Japan
Falcons (rugby union) players
Free State Cheetahs players
Griquas (rugby union) players
NTT DoCoMo Red Hurricanes Osaka players
Rugby union fullbacks
Rugby union players from Carletonville
Sharks (Currie Cup) players
Sharks (rugby union) players
South Africa international rugby union players
South African expatriate rugby union players
South African expatriate sportspeople in Japan
South African people of Dutch descent
South African rugby union players
Sunwolves players